KDEN may refer to:

 KDEN-TV, a television station (channel 29) licensed to serve Longmont, Colorado, United States
 Denver International Airport (ICAO code KDEN)